Stephen Michael Conroy (born 18 January 1963) is an Australian former politician who was an Australian Labor Party member of the Senate from 1996 to 2016, representing the state of Victoria. He served as a minister in the Rudd and Gillard governments. He resigned from the Senate in September 2016. He now works as a lobbyist and political commentator.

Early life
Conroy was born in Ely, Cambridgeshire, England, United Kingdom. His parents worked at an air force base, where his mother Jean monitored radar and his father Bill was a sergeant. In December 1973 the Conroys moved to Canberra, Australia, where he attended Daramalan College. He obtained a Bachelor of Economics at the Australian National University in Canberra. His involvement in student politics was minimal, although he helped organise a rally against student fees.

Politics

After university, Conroy worked as an advisor to Ros Kelly and Barry Jones. He moved to Melbourne to pursue a political career where he met Robert Ray, and served for a time as Superannuation Officer with the Transport Workers Union and as a City of Footscray councillor. He was appointed to the Senate in 1996 when Gareth Evans resigned to contest a seat in the Lower House. In October 1998, Conroy joined the Opposition Shadow Ministry and in 2001 became Deputy Opposition Leader in the Senate. He was Shadow Minister for Trade, Corporate Governance and Financial Services from 2003 to 2004, and became Shadow Minister for Communications and Information Technology in October 2004.

Conroy is a leading member of the Labor Right and was criticised in early 2006 by members of the Labor Left and Simon Crean for working for the replacement of several long-serving MPs with new members, including Bill Shorten, Richard Marles, Mark Dreyfus, Nathan Murphy and Matt Carrick. After Simon Crean's win in the Hotham pre-selection, where Conroy supported Martin Pakula for the position, Crean attacked Conroy repeatedly, calling on him to resign his position as Deputy Leader of the Opposition in the Senate.

In April 2009, Conroy faced criticism after he made comments disparaging the ISP iiNet's defence in a Federal Court case against a number of film studios and Channel Seven. Opposition spokesmen described the comments as prejudicial. After iiNet won, Conroy said it was disappointing the two sides had ended up in court. In February 2010, he admitted using his influence to have a former Labor politician Mike Kaiser, take the position of Government Relations and External Affairs Executive with the National Broadband Network. Kaiser was previously forced to retire from the Labor party due to electoral fraud. Also in February 2010, he was reported to have spent some time while on holiday with Kerry Stokes weeks before cutting licence fees that are charged to free-to-air networks, including Stokes' broadcasting Seven Network.

In June 2010, Conroy was criticised by SAGE-AU for "misinformation that verged on fear-mongering" when he suggested Google street view cars could have captured internet banking details in their recording of wireless network traffic, as these are generally exchanged over secure HTTPS connections. In March 2013, he introduced six media reform bills, one of which would have been the establishment of a Public Interest Media Advocate, a government organisation set up to regulate the previously self-regulated media in Australia. After announcing there would be no discussion over the bills, and that they would be passed or failed as a package, he backed down, allowing negotiation with parties who held the balance of power in the senate. The content of the bills were largely condemned by media.  Ultimately, only two of the six bills passed, and at that the least controversial ones. Should he have introduced the 7 bills, the controversy may have been surpassed.

Portfolio
Conroy was Minister for Broadband, Communications and the Digital Economy in the First Rudd, First Gillard and Second Gillard Ministries. The NBN roll out was dogged with delay and cost blowouts in his time as minister. In that role, he was responsible for internet censorship, the National Broadband Network, and the proposed switch to digital television as a complete replacement for analogue. In May 2010 he was appointed as a founding member to a new United Nations commission, the Broadband Commission for Digital Development.

Internet censorship 

Conroy faced severe criticism over his Internet censorship policies from various groups. While initially promoted as a way to block child pornography, the censorship policy has been extended to include legal material traditionally refused classification by the Office of Film and Literature Classification (now known as the Australian Classification Board), including sites depicting drug use, crime, sex, cruelty, violence or "revolting and abhorrent phenomena" that "offend against the standards of morality". On 19 March 2009 it was reported that ACMA's blacklist of banned sites had been leaked online, and had been published by WikiLeaks. About half of the list was child-porn related; the remainder included sites dealing with legal porn, online gambling, euthanasia, Christianity and fringe religions; sites belonging to a tour operator, dentist and animal carers were also listed. Conroy described the leak and publication of the blacklist as "grossly irresponsible" and that it undermined efforts to improve "cyber safety". In June 2009 he was named "Internet villain of the year" at the 11th annual Internet industry awards in the UK, for "individuals or organisations that have upset the Internet industry and hampered its development – those whom the industry loves to hate."

In December 2009 "Internet pranksters" registered the domain name stephenconroy.com.au which was swiftly removed by auDA raising concerns about auDA's political neutrality and the further potential for suppression of political speech after the proposed mandatory Internet filter is legislated.

In May 2010, Conroy was accused of deliberately misrepresenting iiNet's position with regards to the new internet filter. His department could also not say where he obtained other figures from, such as how he believes that 85% of ISPs support the new filter.

In September 2012 Conroy stated:

Resignation from Parliament
Stephen Conroy foreshadowed his resignation from parliament in a tabled speech on 15 September 2016; he resigned on 30 September 2016.

On 25 October, a joint sitting of the Victorian Parliament appointed Kimberley Kitching as his replacement.

Career after politics
In December 2016 it was announced that Conroy would be head of a new industry body for the gambling industry, Responsible Wagering Australia, backed by bookmakers CrownBet, Sportsbet, Betfair, Unibet and Bet365. In 2017, he joined Sky News Australia as a political commentator.

Personal life
Senator Conroy is a Roman Catholic and socially conservative. While he voted against the abortion drug RU486 in a conscience vote, he has claimed not to have taken a conservative position on all issues:

"I think the point I made was that while I would prefer there to be a parliamentary framework for the RU486, I think it was, debate, if the actual issue was before Parliament I would probably vote for the distribution of the pill. People often say, oh no Steve's a conservative Catholic, but they won't ever find on my voting record something that backs that up. I voted against the Northern Territory's euthanasia legislation. I voted for some of the cloning debate. So I voted in, I like to consider the issues on their merits and I voted what some would characterise as conservatively and some would characterise as progressively on a number of issues."

Conroy and his wife, Paula Benson, have one daughter.

He was a national volleyball representative as a teenager and was the President of Volleyball Victoria from 2004 to 2019.

See also
 First Rudd Ministry
 First Gillard Ministry
 Second Gillard Ministry

References

External links
Stephen Conroy's website as minister for DBCDE
 Summary of parliamentary voting for Senator Stephen Conroy on TheyVoteForYou.org.au
 

1963 births
Living people
Australian Labor Party members of the Parliament of Australia
Labor Right politicians
Australian National University alumni
Australian Roman Catholics
Australian people of Irish descent
English emigrants to Australia
English people of Irish descent
English Roman Catholics
Members of the Australian Senate for Victoria
Members of the Cabinet of Australia
Naturalised citizens of Australia
Government ministers of Australia
People from Ely, Cambridgeshire
People who lost British citizenship
21st-century Australian politicians
20th-century Australian politicians
People educated at Daramalan College
Intelligent Community Forum